A Hajj passport was a special passport used only for entry into Saudi Arabia for the purpose of performing hajj (Muslim pilgrimage to Mecca and adjacent sites). This passport is no longer used, as Saudi Authorities have required ordinary passports since 2009.

Issuing countries 
Afghanistan
Algeria
Bahrain
Bangladesh (for Bangladeshi Muslims only)
Brunei
China (for Chinese Muslims only)
Egypt
Eritrea (for Eritrean Muslims only)
India (for Indian Muslims only)
Indonesia (for Indonesian Muslims only)
Iran
Jordan (also issues a temporary Jordanian passport combined with a Hajj passport to Israeli Muslims)
Kuwait
Lebanon (for Lebanese Muslims only)
Libya
Malaysia (for Malaysian Muslims only)
Maldives
Morocco
Pakistan  (for most Pakistani Muslims, not including Ahmadiyya Muslims)
Palestinian Authority (for Arab Muslims only)
Philippines (for Filipino Muslims only)
Qatar
Senegal
Somalia
Syria
Thailand (for Thai Muslims only; see also Saudi Arabia–Thailand relations)
Tunisia
United Arab Emirates

See also
 Passport

References

External links 
 Saudi government site refers to "Hajj visas:" "..we shall start issuing HAJJ VISAS effective Shawal 11, 1417H. corresponding to February 18, 1997. The last day to issue HAJJ VISAS will be Dhu Al Qada 24, 1417H corresponding to April 2, 1997." It does not refer to "Hajj passports." retrieved Dec. 1, 2006.

Passports
Hajj
Foreign relations of Saudi Arabia
Visa policy by country